Rapture is the first studio album by the Black metal band Dragonlord.

Though essentially a black metal album, much of Eric Peterson's thrash roots can still be heard, likening the sound that to the faster thrash style on Testament's "The Gathering" album mixed with symphonic black metal.  This is also the first time Peterson attempted vocals on any recordings.

Track listing
Lyrics By Eric Peterson & Del James, except where noted.  Music By Eric Peterson.

"Vals de la Muerte [Instrumental]" – 1:52 (Lyle Livingston)
"UnholyVoid" – 4:39
"Tradition and Fire" – 5:00
"Born to Darkness" – 5:22
"Judgement Failed" – 4:20
"Wolf Hunt" – 3:25
"Spirits in the Mist" – 5:03 (Lyrics: Lawrence Mackrory)
"Rapture" – 5:24

Personnel
Eric Peterson - Vocals, Guitars
Steve Smyth - Guitars
Lyle Livingston - Keyboards
Steve DiGiorgio - Bass
Jon Allen - Drums

Production
Arranged By Dragonlord & Del James
Produced By Dragonlord
Engineered By Vincent "Vinny" Wojno, with assistance by Kent Mackte.
Mixed By Daniel Bergstrand at Cutting Room Studios (Uppsala)

Dragonlord (band) albums
2001 albums
Spitfire Records albums
Albums with cover art by Travis Smith (artist)